Alice Sabatini (born 12 October 1996) is an Italian model, beauty pageant titleholder, and former basketball player who was the winner of Miss Italia 2015.

Biography
Sabatini was born in Orbetello (Tuscany) and grown up in Montalto di Castro (Lazio).

Between 2011 and 2015 she played as a forward in the Santa Marinella (IT) professional basketball team; the team was eventually promoted in Serie A2 in 2014.
She participated to the 2013 edition of Miss Grand Prix, winning the Miss Tisanoreica band.

Miss Italia 2015
In 2015 Sabatini participated to Miss Italia. During the contest she unexpectedly achieved notoriety when she was asked in which period of history she would have liked to live in, to which she replied "In '42" much to the spectators' shock, her reasoning being that, as a woman, she would have experienced World War II without having to fight it. She eventually won the crown on 21 September, but was heavily ridiculed for her answer.
A few days after winning the title, Sabatini was asked during an interview for her favorite Italian historical figure, to which she replied "Michael Jordan", being a huge fan of him. This led to another barrage of mockery. Because of the derision that mounted against her, she later ended up suffering from depression and panic attacks.

References

1996 births
Living people
Sportspeople from the Province of Grosseto
Forwards (basketball)
Italian women's basketball players
Italian beauty pageant winners
People from Orbetello
Italian female models
Beauty pageant controversies